First Nations Police is a collective of aboriginal police forces in Ontario. FNP agencies are responsible for police duties concerning reserves in Ontario.  First Nations Constables are appointed by the Commissioner of the Ontario Provincial Police and have the powers of a Police Officer within the Province of Ontario for the purpose of carrying out the duties specified in their appointment.

First Nation Police agencies include:

 Six Nations Police  - Ohsweken, Ontario
 Wikwemikong Tribal Police- Wikwemikong, Ontario
 Nishnawbe-Aski Police Service- Thunder Bay, Ontario
 Treaty Three Police Service- Kenora, Ontario
 UCCM Anishnaabe Police Service- M'Chigeeng First Nation, Ontario
 Anishinabek Police Service- Garden River, Ontario
 Tyendinaga Mohawk Police - Shannonville, Ontario
 Akwesasne Mohawk Police - Akwesasne, Ontario
 Georgina Island Police- Chippewas of Georgina Island, Ontario
 Walpole Island Police Service- Wallaceburg, Ontario
 Rama Police Service- Chippewas of Rama First Nation, Ontario
 Hiawatha Police Service- Hiawatha First Nation, Ontario

See also
 Aboriginal police in Canada

References

Law enforcement agencies of Ontario
First Nations organizations in Ontario
Law enforcement agencies of First Nations in Canada
First Nations in Ontario